Melica altissima, commonly known as Siberian melic grass or dark purple Siberian melic, is a species of plant in the grass family, Poaceae.

It has been naturalized in North America, in Ontario, Oklahoma and New York.

References

altissima
Flora of Siberia
Flora of Asia
Flora of North America
Plants described in 1753
Taxa named by Carl Linnaeus